Nam Pat is a watercourse in Thailand, part of the Chao Phraya River basin. It joins the Nan River in Uttaradit Province.

Pat